The Batangas Provincial Board is the Sangguniang Panlalawigan (provincial legislature) of the Philippine province of Batangas.

The members are elected via plurality-at-large voting: the province is divided into six districts, two representatives in each district. The candidates with the highest number of votes in each district, depending on the number of members the district sends, are elected. The vice governor is the ex officio presiding officer, and only votes to break ties. The vice governor is elected via the plurality voting system province-wide.

The districts used in appropriation of members is coextensive with the legislative districts of Batangas.

District apportionment

List of members
An additional three ex officio members are the presidents of the provincial chapters of the Association of Barangay Captains, the Councilors' League, the Sangguniang Kabataan
provincial president; the municipal and city (if applicable) presidents of the Association of Barangay Captains, Councilor's League and Sangguniang Kabataan, shall elect amongst themselves their provincial presidents which shall be their representatives at the board.

Current members

 Vice Governor: Jose Antonio S. Leviste II (PDP-Laban)

Membership summary
The term of elected officials of the Sangguniang Kabataan elected in 2010 expired on November 30, 2013, and were not replaced.

Vice Governor

1st District

2nd District

3rd District

4th District

5th District (Batangas City)

6th District (Lipa City)

Philippine Councilor's League President

Association of Barangay Captains President

Sangguniang Kabataan President 

Provincial boards in the Philippines
Government of Batangas